Jeremy Porter is a guitar player, singer and songwriter from Marquette, Michigan, currently living in Plymouth, Michigan (near Detroit). He is the founder of the Detroit-based band Jeremy Porter & The Tucos and co-founder of The Regulars, considered one of the first punk bands in the Upper Peninsula of Michigan.

Early life 

Jeremy Porter was born in 1969 in Alpena, Michigan, a small town in the Lower Peninsula of Michigan, to John and Francie Porter. Jeremy has a younger sister, Kristen Porter. Jeremy started playing guitar at an early age, but became bored with the instrument and stopped playing until he was grounded for a summer for vandalizing the house of the vice principal of his junior-high school. With nothing else to pass the time, he picked up the guitar again and stuck with it.

Influences 

Porter's first exposure to music came from his parents' record collection as he gained an early appreciation for The Beatles and The Beach Boys, then later The Rolling Stones, Bob Dylan, Gordon Lightfoot and Fleetwood Mac. In the late 70s, like many his age, Porter discovered and latched onto Kiss before expanding into American power pop bands like The Knack and Cheap Trick. In the early 80s, he saw The Who's final concert broadcast on HBO and became enamored with their aggressive style and attack and the guitar playing of Pete Townshend. Around the same time, Porter became obsessed with heavy metal bands like Ozzy Osbourne, Iron Maiden and Scorpions, looking for something even edgier than The Who, but with a smaller sphere of influence that was more inclusive.

Bands

The Regulars (Marquette) 

In 1984, the Porters moved to Marquette, Michigan, the largest city in the Upper Peninsula of Michigan (UP). Though still small by population standards, Marquette offered more culture and options for a young musician, and Jeremy soon met John Burke, a drummer who shared Porter's love for The Who. The two 16 year-olds formed The Regulars with bassist Fritz Vankosky and singer Tim Demarte in early 1985. Burke immediately exposed Porter to the world of punk rock and the bands of the genre from California, Minnesota, New York and England, which Porter embraced as a more achievable music plateau than the metal bands he loved presented, and an opportunity to bond with his new friends.

The Regulars played mostly punk and 1960s garage covers by bands like Ramones, Dead Kennedys, The Replacements, The Monkees and The Who, but by 1987 the members were each writing songs and the band would occasionally play their originals. The Regulars stayed together until Burke and Vankosky moved downstate to go to college in the fall of 1987, but got together in Marquette for reunion shows in 2003, 2005, 2007, and 2012. Burke would go on to form WIG and record 2 records for Island/PolyGram Records. Vankosky went into music production and engineering and would join the Psychopathic Records team and work with Insane Clown Posse and Twiztid.

Considered one of the earliest punk bands in the UP, the band's influence can still be felt today in the Marquette music scene.

Chutes & Ladders and SlugBug (Detroit) 

 In September 1988, Jeremy Porter moved to Ypsilanti, Michigan, where he attended Eastern Michigan University. After two years of failing to find like-minded musicians, Porter met Brian Wimpy, Brad Hales, Dan Cervantes and William Brennan who took him in as the fifth member of their new band Chutes and Ladders. The band played regionally for two years, including a trip to Philadelphia, where they opened up for the well known bands Tar and The Unsane, but only after (as a favor to the promoter) they agreed to tell people they were Cum Dumpster, the Detroit band originally booked for the show, who had cancelled with little notice. Porter and Brennan were the chief songwriters with Hales and Cervantes contributing occasionally. On August 12, 1991, Chutes & Ladders played with a young punk band from California called Green Day at a house party in Grosse Ile, MI, just a couple years before their breakout album Dookie!.

In 1992, Jeremy Porter and Chutes and Ladders drummer Brian Wimpy formed SlugBug with Randy Barrett III and Chris Hartmann. SlugBug would become a nationally established and well-known pop punk band, releasing two EPs, two 7-inch singles and a posthumous anthology for Chicago record label Red Eye Growler Records. The band toured the Midwest and East Coast extensively before breaking up in 2000 amidst tensions between members and their desires to play in other projects. SlugBug was nominated for Album of the Year at the Detroit Music Awards in 1992 for their debut EP Strong Enough For A Man...But Made For A Woman.

Clashback 

Porter and Hartmann formed Clashback in 2000. Described as "A celebration of the music of The Clash" rather than a tribute band, because the members did not try to look, act, or sound like The Clash, but rather, a Midwest bar band playing all Clash songs. Clashback played regularly for four years and continues to perform occasionally today. Clashback was never intended to be more than a side project for Porter, but it was his primary focus and outlet between the breakup of SlugBug and the formation of The OffRamps.

The OffRamps 

 In 2002, Jeremy Porter recruited bassist Jason Bowes (Culture Bandits, Head Injury, The Hoolapoppers) and drummer Mike Popovich (The Holy Cows, 3-Speed) and formed The OffRamps, a power pop band. The OffRamps recorded two albums for Ann Arbor, Michigan's Deluxe Records, Hate It When You’re Right (2006) and Split The Difference (2008)  before breaking up in December 2008 after member's commitments to other projects made working together difficult. In their eight years, The OffRamps became well known for their catchy songs and a tight and polished live show and played extensively across Michigan and Ohio. Popovich would move on to join Bloodshot recording artist Whitey Morgan and the 78s  and later Ann Arbor-based Blue Snaggletooth, and Bowes would remain on bass for Porter's next two bands: Fidrych, and The Tucos.

Solo Acoustic 

As The OffRamps were breaking up, Jeremy Porter started playing solo-acoustic shows, pulling material from the catalogs of his previous bands and working on the material that would become Party Of One, Party of One was a Regulars reunion of sorts, co-produced and mixed by Fritz Vankosky, with his bass playing on some tracks. John Burke played drums on several tracks and Tim Demarte co-produced a session with Marquette-based vocalist Jenna Gueke for the track "Last Time I Saw You Happy". Also appearing on the record were Randy Barrett III, original SlubBug guitarist, who co-wrote the song "Out Inside" and contributed backing vocals, Ken Haas from Reverend Guitars, and Be Hussey (Morsel) who played bass and engineered Burke's drum sessions at Comp'ny Recording Studio in Los Angeles, California. For the first time since SlugBug, Jeremy toured extensively in support of the record, hitting several major markets in the United States including New York City, Nashville Chicago St. Louis, Minneapolis, and for the first time, Canada, playing shows in Toronto, Montreal, and Wakefield, Quebec.

For the next decade or so Jeremy played the occasional solo set but focused mostly on his work with The Tucos. In 2018 he contributed a cover of Steve Earle's "Christmas in Washington" to the annual Bermuda Snohawk Christmas compilation CD.In 2019 Jeremy released the 1987 EP on GTG Records - 4 new acoustic-based songs recorded in his basement and mixed by Tucos bandmate Gabriel Doman. He did a few shows supporting the release, including a short run south to West Virginia and Kentucky, where he headlined a small festival on a goat farm.

in 2021 as the music business slowly and partially emerged from the Covid 19 pandemic, Jeremy played a private party in Ypsilanti, MI with Ben Nichols of Lucero and Shane Sweeney of Two Cow Garage. Soon after he was back on the road playing solo-acoustic dates in Illinois and Iowa. In the fall he did some more road work in Indiana and Illinois before teaming with Lansing's The Wild Honey Collective for a tour out to the east coast and back. Porter opened the shows, then was backed by The Wild Honey Collective for some songs before taking a support role on lap steel guitar, mandolin, and guitar. The tour took them to upstate New York, Maine, Vermont, New Jersey, Pennsylvania, and Ohio. Jeremy would play lap-steel on The Wild Honey Collectives second album Volume 2 on the 
Buck Owens' track "There Goes My Love," a staple of the live set on that tour.

Fidrych 

Shortly after The Offramps disbanded, Jeremy teamed up with OffRamps bassist Jason Bowes and Porchsleeper members front-man Brian Raleigh and drummer Steve Bekkala and formed Fidrych, named after Mark "The Bird" Fidrych, the Detroit Tigers’ eccentric pitcher from the late 1970s. Porter and Raleigh shared songwriting and guitar duties. Fidrych debuted at the 2009 Hamtramck Blowout after a warmup show in Kalamazoo, Michigan, the week before and would go on to play several shows around lower Michigan and a short run to Minneapolis where they played the Uptown Bar shortly before the iconic venue was razed and replaced by an Apple store.

In 2010. Fidrych played just three shows, each in the Detroit area, and Porter focused on his solo-acoustic work in an effort to stay busy and active. Though the band never officially broke up and remain friends, they have not played since, and Raleigh and Bekkala have enjoyed a Porchsleeper reunion that started in 2014.

Jeremy Porter & The Tucos 

In December 2010, frustrated with the lack of activity with Fidrych and bored with the lack of camaraderie and volume that comes with playing and touring solo-acoustic, Porter formed Jeremy Porter & The Tucos with OffRamps/Fidrych bassist Jason Bowes and drummer Gabriel Doman, who had once tried out on Guitar for Clashback several years earlier. Jeremy Porter & The Tucos became very active very quickly and were soon opening for national acts around Detroit and doing short runs of shows around the Midwest. In 2013 they released Partner In Crime and in 2015 they released Above The Sweet Tea Line (with new bassist Patrick O’Harris), both on Detroit's New Fortune Records, to great reviews. The band has toured more extensively than any of Porter's past projects, hitting the Midwest. East Coast, Southeast, Southwest and Deep South as well as Canada multiple times, and was nominated for a Detroit Music Award for “Outstanding Punk/Indie/Alternative Artist/Group” in 2016, Porter's first nomination since SlugBug in 1992.

In 2017, Jeremy Porter and The Tucos played over 40 shows across the US and Canada, including an October run that took them through the Dustbowl and back to Texas for the first time since 2014. They opened shows in Detroit for Ha Ha Tonka (band) and Beach Slang and released their third album, and first for the Lansing-based GTG Records, "Don't Worry, It's Not Contagious." 2018 saw The Tucos play their first ever shows overseas with a nine-show tour of the UK in October.  They also released their fifth 7" single "At Least She's Still In Love With You". 

The band's 4th album "Candy Coated Cannonball" was released in January, 2021, but they were unable to tour because of the Coronavirus. The Tucos opened for Soul Aslyum in September, one of the band's long-time influences, and played a few regional shows before bassist Bob Moulton left the band. They released a new holiday Song in late 2021 with new bassist Jake Riley  and played more shows in 2022 than they had to-date, including opening slots for Cracker and The Reverend Peyton's Big Damn Band.

Timeline

Media placement 

Several songs by The OffRamps were featured in the independent film Fantasy Football: The Movie in 2007. The band attended the premiere at Emagine Theater in Novi, Michigan.

The songs "Hallmark Holiday" and "Dead on your Feet" from Jeremy Porter, Party of One were used in the PBS series Roadtrip Nation in 2010. "Hallmark Holiday" was included on the soundtrack for the show.

"Knocked Out Cold" by Jeremy Porter and The Tucos was used in Episode 2, Season 1 of the Canadian Bell-Fibe TV series PB With J celebrating the world of plant-based food.

Collaborations 

 Jeremy co-wrote the song "Sleep It Off" by Head Injury, a Livonia, Michigan-based band that often played shows with SlugBug. The song was released as a 7-inch single on Red Eye Growler Records in 1996.
 Jeremy often appeared onstage with the Lexington, Kentucky, band Those Crosstown Rivals in 2014, playing guitar on their song "Trucker" and singing a cover of The Replacements’ "Bastards of Young" with TCR front man Bryan Minks. In 2015, he often joined them onstage to sing backup vocals on their show-closer "Blood, Sweat and Tears".
 Jeremy played lead guitar and received a co-writer credit on "Sometimes You Headline, Sometimes You Just Play Last" by Porchsleeper in 2014. The song was originally done by Fidrych. The track was produced by Jim Roll and released digitally by Porchsleeper in 2015.
 Jeremy played guitar and sang backup vocals on "Hey Lydia" and "Best Worst Night" by the Columbus, Ohio, band Watershed in 2015. The tracks were released in 2016 as a "Summer Single" with a few selected bonus tracks.
 Jeremy played lap-steel on a cover of Buck Owens' "There Goes My Love" by the Lansing, Michigan, band The Wild Honey Collective on their album Volume 2 in 2022. 
 Jeremy co-wrote the song "Wait and See" with Lenny Grassa for his band Popular Creeps out of Detroit, Michigan for their second album All Of This Will End In Tears released on Big Stir Records in 2022.

Writing

Concert and album reviews 

In 2006 Jeremy Porter was a contributor to the now-defunct music website Drastic Plastic. In addition to concert and album reviews he also conducted and published an interview with James Fearnley of The Pogues, which also appeared on the Jer's Pogues Pub website.

In 2013 Porter was a regular contributor to the now-defunct Detroit-based MotorCityRocks website. He regularly reviewed albums and concerts and wrote show previews for upcoming shows in the Detroit area.

In September 2016 Jeremy Porter started contributing reviews and previews to Pencilstorm, a Columbus, Ohio-based blog run by Colin Gawel from the band Watershed (American band). Porter has become the Co-Editor in Chief for the site and is one of the principal contributors and content directors.

Rock And Roll Restrooms 

In 2010 Porter started taking photos of the restrooms in the bars and clubs he was playing at. The photographs were embraced by his social-media followers, especially on Facebook and Instagram. In 2014 Porter compiled several of the photos into a book called Rock And Roll Restrooms: A Photographic Memoir Vol. I:  A Unique Look Into The Seedy Underbelly of Small Time Rock And Roll. Small quantities of the book were printed in both hard and softcover and sold while on tour with Jeremy Porter & The Tucos, but due to the high production costs and his focus on music, additional pressings are on hold pending the search for a publishing deal.

Reverend Guitars 

Porter is a featured artist for Reverend Guitars, a Michigan–Ohio-based company. Porter owns and plays two of the Pete Anderson signature models, and they have become a key element to his respected tone.

Personal life 

Porter currently lives in Plymouth, Michigan, with his wife Noreen. The couple have been married since 1996 and have no children. Between the demanding touring and recording schedule of Jeremy Porter & The Tucos, he stays busy writing about music for Pencil Storm and attending rock shows around Detroit. Outside of music Porter works in the technology field and enjoys traveling with his wife and exploring the culture, food and nightlife of Detroit.

Discography

References

External links 
 Jeremy Porter
 Jeremy Porter & The Tucos
 The Regulars, Marquette Michigan Powerpop Punk
 Clashback, Celebrating The Music Of The Clash
 Jeremy Porter, Allmusic.com

Singers from Detroit
Power pop musicians
American rock songwriters
American male singer-songwriters
American male guitarists
American indie rock musicians
American alternative rock musicians
American punk rock musicians
American alternative country musicians
American rock guitarists
American rock singers
People from Marquette, Michigan
People from Plymouth, Michigan
Living people
Guitarists from Detroit
Country musicians from Michigan
Year of birth missing (living people)
Singer-songwriters from Michigan